Karczyn-Wieś  is a small village in Poland the administrative district of Gmina Inowrocław, within Inowrocław County, Kuyavian-Pomeranian Voivodeship, in north-central Poland. In Karczyn are 12 houses, one roundabound, paintball Ares. There is well knowing  artist Krystian Wrzeszcz  he has his own studio Kazzul studio.

References

Villages in Inowrocław County